Devil in the Flesh (original title: Il diavolo in corpo) is an Italian film released in 1986 and directed by Marco Bellocchio.

An adaptation of Raymond Radiguet’s novel Le Diable au corps, the film stars Federico Pitzalis as a high school student who falls in love with an older woman (played by Maruschka Detmers).

Storyline
An Italian high school student named Andrea becomes infatuated with Giulia, an older woman he sees outside his classroom window. Giulia's fiancé, a leftist radical, has been jailed and is currently on trial for political crimes. Andrea and Giulia meet and begin a sexual relationship, rendezvousing in her apartment. The situation becomes complicated when her fiancé's mother finds out about this and confronts Andrea's father. a psychiatrist and psychoanalyst who has treated Giulia in the past. The psychiatrist finds himself the target of Giulia's sexual advances, which he attributes to madness. As a passionate affair unfolds between Giulia and Andrea, the viewer is left wondering exactly how mentally unbalanced Giulia really is, and whether she had an affair with the boy's father as well. Intensity of passion between Giulia and Andrea builds towards a climax. Andrea's father confronts him about the affair, but Andrea does not back down. Giulia's husband is released from jail. The final ten minutes present a fitting conclusion to all the confusion and passion built up craftily in the film.

Production
One of the more notable aspects of the film is an extended (though darkly lit) scene in which the character played by Maruschka Detmers performs unsimulated (i.e., actual) fellatio on the character played by Federico Pitzalis.

The oral sex scene between Maruschka Detmers and Federico Pitzalis wasn't part of the script. It was Massimo Fagioli, a Marco Bellocchio's collaborator, who suggested it."

References

External links

Films directed by Marco Bellocchio
1986 romantic drama films
1986 films
Italian romantic drama films
Erotic romance films
Films based on French novels
Films based on romance novels
Italian erotic drama films
1980s erotic drama films
1980s Italian-language films
1980s Italian films